or Othello World for Game Boy, is a video game developed by HAL Laboratory, made for the Nintendo Entertainment System.

Versions of the game were first released on home consoles by Philips Magnavox on the Odyssey 2 as Dynasty in 1978, and later on the Atari 2600 in 1980. Othello is based on the board game Reversi, which was marketed as Othello.

Gameplay
It is played with two-sided (black and white) chips, also called discs, on a board. The player can choose between black or white chips. Games are either player versus computer or player versus player. The goal is to end the game with as many chips showing your color as possible. To do this, players must sandwich their opponents' chip(s) between a piece of their own color already on the board, and the piece being played.  The game has four skill levels when playing the computer, as well as a hidden fifth level if you beat the computer on level four.

There is supposedly a slot machine game that is revealed when pressing Select + A at the main menu screen (the word slot will appear atop the screen and the game is said to start after you complete a two player game), but some users have reported that nothing happens after the word "slot" shows up.

See also
Reversi

References

Nintendo Entertainment System games
Game Boy games
1986 video games
Video games based on board games
Video games developed in Japan
Reversi software